Carnegie is a suburb in Melbourne, Victoria, Australia, 12 km south-east of Melbourne's Central Business District, on the railway line between Caulfield and Oakleigh, located within the City of Glen Eira local government area. Carnegie recorded a population of 17,909 at the 2021 census.

The suburb's main shopping precinct is a well-regarded ‘eat street,’ with cafes and restaurants lining Koornang Road from Dandenong Road to Neerim Road. Koornang Park and the neighbouring Carnegie Swim Centre are located between Koornang Road, Munro Avenue and Lyons Street. 

Originally called Rosstown, after William Murray Ross, a prominent property developer and entrepreneur, a name change came about due to Ross' failed speculative developments.
In 1909 it was renamed Carnegie. It has been suggested that this was done in an unsuccessful attempt to secure funds for a library from the philanthropist Andrew Carnegie but there is no contemporary evidence supporting this.

Its postcode is 3163.

History

Toponymy
The area was originally called Rosstown, after the developer William Murray Ross, who owned a large amount of land in the area. The original name lives on in the name of the local hotel, and in Rosstown Road. Leila Road is named after Ross's wife, and Grange Road is named after Ross's estate, The Grange, which has since been subdivided into suburban housing estates.

Establishment
In 1875 Ross began circulating a broadsheet proposal which detailed the Rosstown project, a large scale sugar beet processing mill, a railway line to serve it, and a residential estate, named after him on the edge of the metropolis between Melbourne and the town of Oakleigh.   Although he began building the mill, it never began production, and the Rosstown Railway he constructed was never used.

However the estate sold well and gradually Rosstown had grown to a reasonable size aided by the opening of the railway to Melbourne in 1879.

Carnegie Post Office opened on 1 September 1911.  Carnegie was originally part of the City of Caulfield and by the 1920s it had a substantial commercial area.

The Carnegie Theatre was a popular cinema in the 1930s.

Carnegie Library and Community Centre sits between Koornang Road and Shepparson St, with a nearby Community space developed in 2021.

Transport

The northern part of Carnegie and the Koornang Road shopping strip is served by Carnegie station on the Cranbourne/Pakenham line. Carnegie is served by CDC Melbourne bus routes 623, 624, 626, 900 and NightBus 980. Tram route 67 terminates just south of the shopping centre and serves the southern part of Carnegie. The Public Transport Users Association has instigated calls for its extension to the nearby Carnegie station which services the shopping centre, as a major mode interchange .

Buses
 SmartBus service
 NightBus services

Trains
There are two train services that pass through Carnegie railway station. As part of the government's Level Crossing Removal Project, Carnegie station closed in January 2017 and was demolished with a replacement opening in November 2017.

Demographics

Carnegie has a diverse cultural cross-section, with many permanent settlers from across the globe, and transient international students studying at the nearby Monash University (Caulfield campus).

Commercial centres

Koornang Road
On Koornang Road alone there are restaurants and grocers offering Malaysian, Korean, Chinese, Thai, Japanese, Indian, Italian, Greek, Polish, French, Vietnamese, Uighur and Russian foods, as well as the Rosstown Hotel.

Princes Highway

Dandenong road is increasingly becoming a focus of Carnegie's development. Originally the Rosstown Hotel was the focus of this part of the commercial strip, however today there are numerous showrooms and homemaker stores.

Schools

The main primary school is Carnegie Primary School (No. 2897), established in 1888 as Rosstown State School.

Parks and recreation

Surrounded by native bushland, Packer Park has a broad range of sport and recreation facilities including a velodrome (cycling), football oval, tennis and basketball practice areas, lawn bowls/bocce greens, extensive adventure playground, BBQs, a wetland walking trail and off-leash dog-walking areas.

The Velodrome, located at Packer Park, is one of the few of its kind in Victoria and is home to Carnegie Caulfield Cycling Club. Athletes used the velodrome as a cycling training venue during the 1956 Melbourne Olympic Games, while Australian athletes trained here for the 1960 and 1964 Olympic Games.

The 17 km-long Djerring Trail, which runs under the elevated rail pylons, was completed in 2018. The leafy, shared pedestrian/bike path has exercise stations, and links Carnegie to Murrumbeena (east) and Caulfield (west). Table tennis tables (bring your own bats and balls) and exercise equipment are adjacent to the trail opposite the train station on the west side of Koornang Road.

The Carnegie War Memorial features a rose garden and cypress trees on Koornang Road, midway between Neerim Road and North Road. This is also the playground side of Koornang Park, which also provides grassed areas, walking trails, golf cages and cricket nets, and is home to Caulfield Football Club and Caulfield Junior Football Club. Carnegie Memorial Swimming Pool is a beloved outdoor 50s-style complex with grassed areas undergoing redevelopment. The new complex will provide for indoor and outdoor aquatic sport and recreation. 

It's home to home to Carnegie Cricket Club, Carnegie South Cricket Club, Monash Gryphons Cricket Club, Glen Eira Football (soccer) Club, Caulfield Cougars Soccer Club and Glen Eira Junior Soccer Club.

Notable people
 Artist and beloved one-time cafe owner Rita Santucci created many colourful ceramic tile artworks along Koornang Road main street and its little laneways. Rita's Way is a reclaimed laneway oasis off Koornang Road named in honour of her contribution.
 Selina Jenkins is an acclaimed musician, award winning cabaret artist and celebrated character comedian.
 Tomas Lorenzo is an international award-winning Australian Spanish composer and performer, originally from Barcelona, and founded the Creative Guitar School in Carnegie.
 Australian artist Lisa Roet is world renown for her giant chimpanzee and golden monkey sculptures which scale buildings, and simian inspired jewellery amongst other works. 
 Alicia Sometimes is an Australia writer, poet and broadcaster.
 Former Hawthorn Australian Football League player, Len Andrews (1922–2010), originally played for Carnegie.

See also
 City of Caulfield – Carnegie was previously within this former local government area.

References

External links
Australian Places: Carnegie

Andrew Carnegie
Suburbs of Melbourne
Suburbs of the City of Glen Eira